Khubelu is a community council located in the Mokhotlong District of Lesotho. Its population was 8,690 as of 2006.

Villages
The community of Khubelu includes the villages of

ForeisetataHa 'MaeuHa HlohloHa LethehaHa MaqhooanaHa MatekaseHa MeiHa MphatsoaneHa MphuthiHa NthusengHa PheraHa PooneHa RalitsepeHa Ramonakalali
Ha SeotsanyaneHa SotaneHa ToebaKhotsangKoenengLetlapengLiepelengLinokong LipelengMabolingMafikengMaheshelengMainyatsoMajakeng
MakhisengMakokoanengMakorongMalingoanengMaotoanaMaqhaungMareseleMasakoanengMasallaMasokongMaterasengMatikiringMatsiengMeeling
MohlolingNqobelleNtšupeSemapongSemonkongSephokongTaungTena-Bapehi (Ha Manakana)Thaba-SepharaThuhloaneTibisingTloha-re-bueTsitsa

References

External links
 Google map of community villages

Populated places in Mokhotlong District